Mukesh Kumar Chawla (born 27 February 1974) is a Pakistani politician hailing from Jacobabad District presently from DHA, Karachi, Sindh, Pakistan belong to Pakistan Peoples Party Parliamentarians. He was serving as Minister of Excise and Taxation and Member of the Provincial Assembly of Sindh. Chawla has served as the excise and taxation minister for around 9 years as of 2017.

Education and political career 
Mukesh Kumar Chawla achieved his MA (Political science) degree from University of Sindh, Jamshoro. He served as member of the Provincial Assembly of Sindh during the Twelfth Assembly from 2002 to 2007 and the Thirteenth Assembly from 2008 to 2013. 
For the Sindh Assembly, Mr. Chawla has served as Excise and Taxation Minister and as Minister overseeing narcotics enforcement and information technology.

References

External links
 

1974 births
Living people
Sindhi people
Pakistan People's Party politicians
Sindh MPAs 2013–2018
People from Sindh
People from Hyderabad District, Pakistan
Pakistani Hindus